Nicole Maria Faltum (born 17 January 2000) is an Australian cricketer who plays as a wicket-keeper and right-handed batter for Victoria in the Women's National Cricket League (WNCL) and the Melbourne Stars in the Women's Big Bash League (WBBL). She played for the Stars in the final of the 2020–21 WBBL season, which they ultimately lost to the Sydney Thunder.

In January 2022, Faltum was named in Australia's A squad for their series against England A, with the matches being played alongside the Women's Ashes.

References

External links

Nicole Faltum at Cricket Australia

2000 births
Living people
People from Traralgon
Cricketers from Victoria (Australia)
Sportswomen from Victoria (Australia)
Australian women cricketers
Melbourne Stars (WBBL) cricketers
Victoria women cricketers